The 2021 Portuguese Grand Prix (officially known as the Formula 1 Heineken Grande Prémio de Portugal 2021) was a Formula One motor race that took place on 2 May 2021 at the Algarve International Circuit in Portimão, Portugal. The 66-lap race was won by Mercedes driver Lewis Hamilton from second. Max Verstappen took second place for Red Bull Racing, with Mercedes's Valtteri Bottas finishing third after starting on pole and rounding out the podium places. This was also the last Portuguese Grand Prix, as the race had not been contracted for the  season and beyond.

Background

The drivers and teams were the same as the season entry list with no additional stand-in drivers for the race. Callum Ilott drove in the first practice session for Alfa Romeo Racing in place of Antonio Giovinazzi, making his Formula One practice debut.

Tyre supplier Pirelli brought the C1, C2 and C3 tyre compounds (designated hard, medium and soft respectively) for teams to use at the event.

Ahead of the Grand Prix organisers announced that a second DRS zone would be available for drivers to aid overtaking. The new DRS zone is established between turns 4 and 5, with the detection point located before turn 4. Unlike the previous edition of the race, the DRS zone located on the main straight was reduced of 120 metres, and the detection point was moved to from turn 14 to after the start of turn 15.

Practice
There were three practice sessions, each an hour in length. The first practice session started at 11:30 local time (UTC+01:00) on 30 April. The second practice session started at 15:00 local time on that afternoon and the final practice session started at 12:00 local time on the following day.

The first practice session ended with Valtteri Bottas fastest for Mercedes ahead of the Red Bulls of Max Verstappen and Sergio Pérez. Lewis Hamilton, who had struggled finding a level of comfort in his car during FP1, was fastest in the second practice session for Mercedes, with Verstappen in second and Bottas rounding out the top three.

Qualifying
Qualifying started at 15:00 local time (UTC+01:00) on 1 May. Valtteri Bottas set provisional pole in his first Q3 run, while Verstappen's first flying lap was invalidated for exceeding track limits. Ultimately, neither Bottas, Hamilton nor Verstappen were able to improve on their second flying laps, and Bottas kept pole.

Qualifying classification

Race
The race started at 15:00 local time on Sunday 2 May. Valtteri Bottas held the lead into turn 1 ahead of Max Verstappen, Lewis Hamilton, Carlos Sainz Jr. and Sergio Pérez. Kimi Räikkönen made contact with teammate Antonio Giovinazzi on the main straight at the end of lap 1 bringing out the safety car. Räikkönen's race was over but Giovinazzi managed to continue without damage.

Race classification 

 Notes
  – Includes one point for fastest lap. Max Verstappen's fastest lap of 1:19.849 on lap 66 was deleted by the stewards for exceeding track limits.
  – Nikita Mazepin received a five-second time penalty for ignoring blue flags. He did not lose any places despite this.

Championship standings after the race

Drivers' Championship standings

Constructors' Championship standings

 Note: Only the top five positions are included for both sets of standings.

Notes

References

External links

Portuguese Grand Prix
Portuguese Grand Prix
Grand Prix
Grand Prix